The Léon Paulet was an automobile manufactured in Marseille, France, between 1922 and 1925. The Type 6AB used a seven-bearing overhead camshaft 3.4 litre engine, designed by former Delage engineer Arthur Michelat.

The engine had a more than passing resemblance to the Hispano-Suiza, and they took Léon Paulet to court. Paulet was ordered to cease production of the Michelat designed engine. Rather than try to find another engine, Paulet ended production after approximately 20 cars had been built.

References

External links
Léon Paulet logo
Restored Type 6AB speedster

Vintage vehicles
Defunct motor vehicle manufacturers of France